The Bloomberg Commodity Index (BCOM) is a broadly diversified commodity price index distributed by Bloomberg Index Services Limited. The index was originally launched in 1998 as the Dow Jones-AIG Commodity Index (DJ-AIGCI) and renamed to Dow Jones-UBS Commodity Index (DJ-UBSCI) in 2009, when UBS acquired the index from AIG. On July 1, 2014, the index was rebranded under its current name.

The BCOM tracks prices of futures contracts on physical commodities on the commodity markets. The index is designed to minimize concentration in any one commodity or sector.  It currently has 23 commodity futures in six sectors. No one commodity can compose more than 15% of the index, no one commodity and its derived commodities can compose more than 25% of the index, and no sector can represent more than 33% of the index (as of the annual weightings of the components). The weightings for each commodity included in BCOM are calculated in accordance with rules account for liquidity and production data in a 2:1 ratio, which ensures that the relative proportion of each of the underlying individual commodities reflects its global economic significance and market liquidity. Annual rebalancing and reweighting ensure that diversity is maintained over time.

Components and weights

See also
S&P GSCI
Reuters/Jefferies CRB Index
Rogers International Commodity Index
Standard & Poor's Commodity Index
NEW-YORK Stock exchange

References

External links
 

Commodity price indices
S&P Dow Jones Indices
UBS